The Cape Canaveral Monsters is a 1960 independent American black-and-white science-fiction film, produced by Lionel Dichter and Richard Greer, and written and directed by Phil Tucker.  It stars Katherine Victor, Jason Johnson, Scott Peters and Linda Connell, Though planned as a theatrical feature, it was ultimately released directly to television. The movies deals with two extraterrestrials who have come to earth to "transmit" healthy, living humans, especially women, back to their home planet and to disrupt rockets launched from Cape Canaveral. It was made shortly before the start of the USA's crewed space program and has been categorized by a reviewer as a later entry in the "reds-under-the-beds," fear-of-communism films that were often part of sci-fi during the 1950s

Plot
As the film opens, two mysterious white circles are moving about on a solid black background. As they move, a woman's voice says they must obtain human bodies to carry out their mission.

Live action then begins with a man and woman leaving a beach near Cape Canaveral, Florida. The circles descend on them, causing their car to crash. Both are killed. But their bodies suddenly jerk back to life as they're taken over by the white circles, which are actually extraterrestrials. The woman's face is badly cut from smashing into the windshield and the man's left arm has been torn off. When they exit the wrecked car, the male alien, Hauron (Jason Jackson), leaves his severed arm behind. The woman alien, Nadja (Katherine Victor), retrieves it and tells him that she'll sew it back on at the laboratory, in an artificial cave they've built as their headquarters.

When Hauron reconnoiters Cape Canaveral one night, an MP's guard dogs attack him and tear off his recently reattached arm. Nonetheless, he uses his "disruptor ray" to shoot down the rockets as soon as they're launched. The rocket scientists, who don't know about the extraterrestrials, work diligently to try to understand why their rockets are exploding.

Meanwhile, Tom Wright (Scott Peters) and Sally Markham (Linda Connell), who both work at the launch site, go on a double-date with their friends Bob (Gary Travis) and Shirley (Thelaine Williams). Tom says that the static coming in over a transistor radio means that an illegal transmitter is operating nearby and theorizes that it may have something to do with the launch failures. He and Sally search for the transmitter, but can't find it.

The four go back another night to look again, but while Tom and Sally are searching, Bob and Shirley are kidnapped by Hauron and Nadja. Bob dies during his capture, so Nadja removes his arm and grafts it onto Hauron. She says Bob had a handsome chin and replaces Hauron's scarred chin with it. Shirley and Bob are both transmitted to the aliens' planet, even though Bob is dead and the aliens have been admonished about sending dead or otherwise damaged specimens.

Not knowing that Shirley and Bob have already been transmitted, Tom and Sally find the cave and are captured. They're kept intact, although held in place by an electronic device. Tom frees himself after discovering he can disable the device by waving his wristwatch's radium dial at it. He goes for help, but leaves Sally behind, forcing him to return because she is still a captive.

Help arrives in the form of sheriff's deputies, Army personnel and rocket scientists. They demand that Nadja and Hauron surrender themselves, but they're captured en masse. Hauron and Nadja incapacitate them, then revert to circle form to transmit themselves home. But before they're able to, the captives awaken. Tom, and Sally's father, the head rocket scientist, concoct a method to prevent the extraterrestrials from transmitting themselves. The humans escape from the cave just before a powerful explosion destroys it. They congratulate each other because Sally and Tom have been rescued and now the space program is safe.

But just as it appears that all is well, Sally and the chief deputy (Lyle Felisse) get into his patrol car. As they drive out of camera range, the tires screech, there are the sounds of a crash and Sally screams. The two white circles on a black background reappear, exactly as at the start of the film. Are the aliens still here?

Cast
The credits at the end of the film list the cast in the following order of appearance:
Jason Johnson as Hauron
Katherine Victor as Nadja
Harriet Dichter as Woman Scientist
Chuck Howard as Maj. Gen. Hollister
Bill Vess as Capt. Martin
Joe Chester as Dr. Meister
Gary Travis as Bob Hardin
Billy Greene as Dr. Heinrich von Hofften
Scott Peters as Tom Wright
Linda Connell as Sally Markham
Tom Allen as Cpl. Williams
Tony Soler as Newsboy
Thelaine Williams as Shirley
Brian F. Wood as Elmer Wesson
Flori Jo Johnson as Police Dispatcher
Lyle Felisse as Chief Deputy
Matt Shaw as Deputy
David King as Detective Allen

Production
The film was shot in Griffith Park and Bronson Caves in Los Angeles and on a beach in Malibu, California, although it was set in and around Cape Canaveral, Florida. Griffith Park and Bronson Caves were the same locations used by Tucker for his first sci-fi movie, Robot Monster, in 1953.

The Cape Canaveral Monsters was apparently the only movie in which Linda Connell, the daughter of the film's cinematographer, W. Merle Connell, appeared. Despite the similarity of last name, it is not known if Harriet Dichter, credited as "Woman Scientist," is or was related to Lionel Dichter, the film's executive producer. It appears to have been the only film Lionel Dichter produced and Harriet Dichter, like Linda Connell, seems to have had no other film or television roles.

The movie was to be filmed in color on a two-week shooting schedule, with time for multiple takes, and with financing provided by "group of dentists or doctors," according to Victor in an interview she gave to critic Tom Weaver .She was paid, she says, $420 or $450 for her role. However, the movie ended up being shot in black-and-white and in single takes because of budget cuts. Nothing about the full production cost of the film has surfaced, although Warren wrote several years after the fact that the "budget must have been minuscule to begin with" and that the movie "does look cheap indeed."

The Cape Canaveral Monsters was produced by CCM Productions Inc. and it was the only film CCM made. (Raw claimed that CCM is the abbreviation of Compagna Cinematographer Mantoro which produced a number of films in Europe in the 1960s, and credits the movie to it.)

The movie was apparently intended to be distributed through states' rights film distributors. However,
film historian Bill Warren notes that while the film was "offered" to theaters, it "may not have been released theatrically," despite being listed by gross magazine as being "available in 1960." No account has been found that indicates the movie was shown in movie theaters, no contemporary posters or lobby cards for it have been found, and no other titles for the film have been located. DVDs of the movie are in boxes directed with at least two different illustrations and at least two poster-size photos from the film - but no ad art - are for sale at various websites.

Nothing has been found about why the film eventually went to TV instead of theaters, although television had a ravenous appetite for movies at the time. For example, more than a hundred "classic" Hollywood films were airing each week in New York City alone by the mid-1960s.

The Cape Canaveral Monsters was sold to television in early 1964 by the distribution company M and A Alexander. It was part of the "Chiller Science Fiction Package" of four movies. The other three were Flight of the Lost Balloon (1961), The Hideous Sun Demon (1959) and The Monster of Piedras Blancas (1961).

Soundtrack 
Four songs played during The Cape Canaveral Monsters can be heard coming from the characters' transistor radio. The songs are listed in the opening credits as "Please Somebody," written by Jerry Coates and performed by Terry Miller; "Love is the Thing," written by John Nieel Jr. and performed by Skip Shane; and "Think of Me" and "I'll Find a Way," written by Morey Bernstein and performed by Jerry Savoy. "Please Somebody" was released in February 1960 on Lute Records (no. L-5903) as the B-side of a 45 rpm single by Terry Miller, with "I'm Available" on the A-side.

Reception
No reviews from the time the movie was completed are known to exist.

Several years later, though, British critic Phil Hardy called The Cape Canaveral Monsters a "belated entry in the reds under the bed cycle of films, which started at the beginning of the Cold War, when the fear of communist "subversion from within became a prevalent force" in the USA. The notion in science fiction is exemplified by such movies as Invasion of the Body Snatchers, which Hardy called a "classic example of an anti-communist film of the period for its handling of the take-over from within theme," although "it is far better and far more complex than such crude reductions suggest." The "anxiety and paranoia" that "marched hand in hand" during the 1950s was reflected in reds-under-the-bed films and events in real life. "Early fifties paranoia tended to link Russians and flying saucers and numerous UFO sightings were imagined to be Russian spy ships or, worse, carrying Russian weapons."

The few other reviewers of The Cape Canaveral Monsters, also writing long after the film was completed, have not been kind to it. Warren called it a "stilted, limited disaster" although he added that "Tucker seemed to be sincere in his efforts to make it a good low-budget film." Kay Glenn wrote, "Though not as ineptly made as Robot Monster, this is all cut-rate stuff, full of plot holes, bad acting, and a few unintentional laughs thanks to the aliens, who bicker like a married couple." And Bryan Senn dismissed it was "an obscure curio in the '60s horror/cinematic cabinet, neither good enough nor bad enough to really stand out." The film holds a low 3.5/10 on the Internet Movie Database from 248 votes.

Several authors have noted that the movie has sexual and gender undertones. Nadja and Hauron "seem to enjoy an active sex life, probably a first for invading aliens." After a hard day's work, "'Let's get some rest,' Hauron suggests, lifting [Nadja's] head with a finger," writes Warren. Bruce Eder says that a greater emphasis on the extraterrestrial's "strange focus on the lusty side of being human" might have "made for a more interesting movie." And the treatment of women in general in Tucker's two sci-fi films has been noted to be sexist by David Elroy Goldweber. "Also like Robot Monster, The Cape Canaveral Monsters verges on the prurient or perverse in its treatment of helpless Earthwomen (in bondage, undressed, and generally useless)."

Pop culture 
Although numerous blogs and websites that deal with movies contain commentary on The Cape Canaveral Monsters, only one reference to it in the traditional mass media has been found. The movie was mentioned in dialogue and a poster of it was shown on the Robot Monster episode of the TV program I Hate Everything: The Search for the Worst in 2015.

Ownership 
Exactly who owns the rights to The Cape Canaveral Monsters is difficult to determine. Two sources agree that the movie, although made in 1960, was not copyrighted until 1988. However, while Turner Classic Movies and Bloomberg say that Paramount Pictures, now part of Viacom Inc. holds the copyright, the American Film Institute says that the copyright is held by Republic Pictures Corp., which at present is a subsidiary of CBS. Yet the film itself shows in the opening credits that it was copyrighted by CCM Productions Inc. in 1960. Several websites that stream the film or sell DVDs of it list it as being in the public domain.

References

External links

1960 films
1960s science fiction films
Films directed by Phil Tucker
American independent films
American black-and-white films
American science fiction television films
Films set in Florida
Films shot in Los Angeles
1960s English-language films
1960s American films